Pardo  is a word used in the Spanish colonies in the Americas to refer to the tri-racial descendants of Europeans, Amerindians, and Africans.

Pardo may also refer to:

People
Pardo (surname)
Pardo Brazilians, a race/skin color category used by the Brazilian Institute of Geography and Statistics (IBGE) in Brazilian censuses

Other
Pardo Ridge, the highest part of Elephant Island, South Shetland Islands, UK
Pardo River (disambiguation)
Capivari River (Pardo River)
Claro River (Pardo River)
Novo River (Pardo River)
Palmital River (Pardo River)
Rio Pardo (tribe)
Rio Pardo, a municipality in Rio Grande do Sul, Brazil
Rio Pardo de Minas, a municipality in Minas Gerais, Brazil
Vargem Grande do Rio Pardo, a municipality in Minas Gerais, Brazil
Ribas do Rio Pardo, a municipality in Mato Grosso do Sul, Brazil
Santa Rita do Pardo, a municipality in Mato Grosso do Sul, Brazil
Santa Cruz do Rio Pardo, a municipality in São Paulo, Brazil
São José do Rio Pardo, a municipality in São Paulo, Brazil
Pardo Miguel District, a district of the Rioja Province, Peru
Abelardo Pardo Lezameta District, a district of the Bolognesi Province, Peru
Mark Pardo Shellworks Site, an archaeological site in Florida
Jacarandá-Pardo
Trabb Pardo–Knuth algorithm
Sport José Pardo, a Peruvian football club
AD El Pardo, a Spanish football club
El Pardo, a ward of Madrid
Royal Palace of El Pardo, palace in the same-named ward of Madrid
Treaty of El Pardo (disambiguation)

See also
Pardoe (disambiguation)
Pardos (disambiguation)